In pure and applied mathematics, quantum mechanics and computer graphics, a tensor operator generalizes the notion of operators which are scalars and vectors. A special class of these are spherical tensor operators which apply the notion of the spherical basis and spherical harmonics. The spherical basis closely relates to the description of angular momentum in quantum mechanics and spherical harmonic functions. The coordinate-free generalization of a tensor operator is known as a representation operator.

The general notion of scalar, vector, and tensor operators

In quantum mechanics, physical observables that are scalars, vectors, and tensors, must be represented by scalar, vector, and tensor operators, respectively. Whether something is a scalar, vector, or tensor depends on how it is viewed by two observers whose coordinate frames are related to each other by a rotation. Alternatively, one may ask how, for a single observer, a physical quantity transforms if the state of the system is rotated. Consider, for example, a system consisting of a molecule of mass , traveling with a definite center of mass momentum, in the  direction. The kinetic energy is a scalar and the momentum is a vector, and these two quantities must be represented by a scalar and a vector operator, respectively. The kinetic energy on the other hand must be represented by a scalar operator, whose expected value must be the same in the initial and the rotated states.

In the same way, tensor quantities must be represented by tensor operators. An example of a tensor quantity (of rank two) is the electrical quadrupole moment of the above molecule. Likewise, the octupole and hexadecapole moments would be tensors of rank three and four, respectively.

Other examples of scalar operators are the total energy operator (more commonly called the Hamiltonian), the potential energy, and the dipole-dipole interaction energy of two atoms. Examples of vector operators are the momentum, the position, the orbital angular momentum, and the spin angular momentum, . (Fine print: Angular momentum is a vector as far as rotations are concerned, but unlike position or momentum it does not change sign under space inversion, and when one wishes to provide this information, it is said to be a pseudovector.)

Scalar, vector and tensor operators can also be formed by products of operators. Similarly, the quadrupole moment tensor of our example molecule has the nine components

.

 is the charge on particle , and
 is the th component of the position of this particle. Each term in the sum is a tensor operator. In particular, the nine products  together form a second rank tensor, formed by taking the direct product of the vector operator  with itself.

Rotations of quantum states

Quantum rotation operator

The rotation operator about the unit vector n (defining the axis of rotation) through angle θ is

where J = (Jx, Jy, Jz) are the rotation generators (also the angular momentum matrices):

and let  be a rotation matrix. According to the Rodrigues' rotation formula, the  rotation operator then amounts to 

An operator  is invariant under a unitary transformation U if

in this case for the rotation ,

Angular momentum eigenkets

A general state

in the space rotates to a new state  by:

Using the completeness condition:

we have

Introducing the Wigner D matrix elements:

gives the matrix multiplication:

For one basis ket:

For the case of orbital angular momentum, the eigenstates  of the orbital angular momentum operator L and solutions of Laplace's equation on a 3d sphere are spherical harmonics:

where Pm is an associated Legendre polynomial,  is the orbital angular momentum quantum number, and m is the orbital magnetic quantum number which takes the values −, − + 1, ...  − 1,  The formalism of spherical harmonics have wide applications in applied mathematics, and are closely related to the formalism of spherical tensors, as shown below.

Spherical harmonics are functions of the polar and azimuthal angles, ϕ and θ respectively, which can be conveniently collected into a unit vector n(θ, ϕ) pointing in the direction of those angles, in the Cartesian basis it is:

So a spherical harmonic can also be written . Spherical harmonic states  rotate according to the inverse rotation matrix , while  rotates by the initial rotation matrix .

Rotation of tensor operators

We define the Rotation of an operator by requiring that the expectation value of the original operator  with respect to the initial state be equal to the expectation value of the rotated operator with respect to the rotated state,

Now as,

 →   → 

we have,

since,  is arbitrary,

Scalar operators

A scalar operator is invariant under rotations:

This is equivalent to saying a scalar operator commutes with the rotation generators:

Examples of scalar operators include
 the energy operator: 
 potential energy V (in the case of a central potential only) 
 kinetic energy T:
 the spin–orbit coupling:

Vector operators

Vector operators (as well as pseudovector operators) are a set of 3 operators that can be rotated according to:

where εijk is the Levi-Civita symbol, which all vector operators must satisfy, by construction. As the symbol εijk is a pseudotensor, pseudovector operators are invariant up to a sign: +1 for proper rotations and −1 for improper rotations.

Vector operators include
 the position operator: 
 the momentum operator: 
and peusodovector operators include
 the orbital angular momentum operator: 
 as well the spin operator S, and hence the total angular momentum 

In Dirac notation:

and since  is any quantum state, the same result follows:

Spherical vector operators

A vector operator in the spherical basis is  where the components are:

and the commutators with the rotation generators are:

where q is a placeholder for the spherical basis labels (+1, 0, −1), and:

(some authors may place a factor of 1/2 on the left hand side of the equation) and raise (J+) or lower (J−) the total magnetic quantum number m by one unit. In the spherical basis the generators are:

The rotation transformation in the spherical basis (originally written in the Cartesian basis) is then:

One can generalize the vector operator concept easily to tensorial operators, shown next.

Tensor operators and their reducible and irreducible representations

A tensor operator can be rotated according to:

Consider a dyadic tensor with components . This rotates infinitesimally according to:

Cartesian dyadic tensors of the form

where a and b are two vector operators:

are reducible, which means they can be re-expressed in terms of a and b as a rank 0 tensor (scalar), plus a rank 1 tensor (an antisymmetric tensor), plus a rank 2 tensor (a symmetric tensor with zero trace):

where the first term

includes just one component, a scalar equivalently written (a·b)/3,  the second

includes three independent components, equivalently the components of (a×b)/2, and the third

includes five independent components. Throughout, δij is the Kronecker delta, the components of the identity matrix. The number in the superscripted brackets denotes the tensor rank. These three terms are irreducible, which means they cannot be decomposed further and still be tensors satisfying the defining transformation laws under which they must be invariant. These also correspond to the number of spherical harmonic functions 2 + 1 for  = 0, 1, 2, the same as the ranks for each tensor. Each of the irreducible representations T(1), T(2) ...  transform like angular momentum eigenstates according to the number of independent components.

Example of a Tensor operator,

 The Quadrupole moment operator, 
 Two Tensor operators can be multiplied to give another Tensor operator. In general, 

Note: This is just an example, in general, a tensor operator cannot be written as the product of two Tensor operators as given in the above example.

Spherical tensor operators

Continuing the previous example of the second order dyadic tensor T = a ⊗ b, casting each of a and b into the spherical basis and substituting into T gives the spherical tensor operators of the second order, which are:

Using the infinitesimal rotation operator and its Hermitian conjugate, one can derive the commutation relation in the spherical basis:

and the finite rotation transformation in the spherical basis is:

In general, tensor operators can be constructed from two perspectives.

One way is to specify how spherical tensors transform under a physical rotation - a group theoretical definition. A rotated angular momentum eigenstate can be decomposed into a linear combination of the initial eigenstates: the coefficients in the linear combination consist of Wigner rotation matrix entries. Spherical tensor operators are sometimes defined as the set of operators that transform just like the eigenkets under a rotation.

A spherical tensor  of rank  is defined to rotate into according to:

where q = k, k − 1, ..., −k + 1, −k. Some authors write Tkq instead of Tq(k), with or without the parentheses enclosing the rank number k.

Another related procedure requires that the spherical tensors satisfy certain commutation relations with respect to the rotation generators Jx, Jy, Jz - an algebraic definition.

The commutation relations of the angular momentum components with the tensor operators are:

For any 3d vector, not just a unit vector, and not just the position vector:

a spherical tensor is a spherical harmonic as a function of this vector a, and in Dirac notation:

(the super and subscripts switch places for the corresponding labels  ↔ k and m ↔ q which spherical tensors and spherical harmonics use).

Spherical harmonic states and spherical tensors can also be constructed out of the Clebsch–Gordan coefficients. Irreducible spherical tensors can build higher rank spherical tensors; if Aq1(k1) and Bq2(k2) are two spherical tensors of ranks k1 and k2 respectively, then:

is a spherical tensor of rank .

The Hermitian adjoint of a spherical tensor may be defined as

There is some arbitrariness in the choice of the phase factor: any factor containing  will satisfy the commutation relations. The above choice of phase has the advantages of being real and that the tensor product of two commuting Hermitian operators is still Hermitian.

Angular momentum and spherical harmonics

Orbital angular momentum and spherical harmonics

Orbital angular momentum operators have the ladder operators:

which raise or lower the orbital magnetic quantum number m by one unit. This has almost exactly the same form as the spherical basis, aside from constant multiplicative factors.

Spherical tensor operators and quantum spin

Spherical tensors can also be formed from algebraic combinations of the spin operators Sx, Sy, Sz, as matrices, for a spin system with total quantum number j =  + s (and  = 0). Spin operators have the ladder operators:

which raise or lower the spin magnetic quantum number ms by one unit.

Applications

Spherical bases have broad applications in pure and applied mathematics and physical sciences where spherical geometries occur.

Dipole radiative transitions in a single-electron atom (alkali)

The transition amplitude is proportional to matrix elements of the dipole operator between the initial and final states. We use an electrostatic, spinless model for the atom and we consider the transition from the initial energy level Enℓ to final level En′ℓ′. These levels are degenerate, since the energy does not depend on the magnetic quantum number m or m′. The wave functions have the form,

The dipole operator is proportional to the position operator of the electron, so we must evaluate matrix elements of the form,

where, the initial state is on the right and the final one on the left. The position operator r has three components, and the initial and final levels consist of 2ℓ + 1 and 2ℓ′ + 1 degenerate states, respectively. Therefore if we wish to evaluate the intensity of a spectral line as it would be observed, we really have to evaluate 3(2ℓ′+ 1)(2ℓ+ 1) matrix elements, for example, 3×3×5 = 45 in a 3d → 2p transition. This is actually an exaggeration, as we shall see, because many of the matrix elements vanish, but there are still many non-vanishing matrix elements to be calculated.

A great simplification can be achieved by expressing the components of r, not with respect to the Cartesian basis, but with respect to the spherical basis. First we define,

Next, by inspecting a table of the Yℓm′s, we find that for ℓ = 1 we have,

where, we have multiplied each Y1m by the radius r. On the right hand side we see the spherical components rq of the position vector r. The results can be summarized by,

for q = 1, 0, −1, where q appears explicitly as a magnetic quantum number. This equation reveals a relationship between vector operators and the angular momentum value ℓ = 1, something we will have more to say about presently. Now the matrix elements become a product of a radial integral times an angular integral,

We see that all the dependence on the three magnetic quantum numbers (m′,q,m) is contained in the angular part of the integral. Moreover, the angular integral can be evaluated by the three-Yℓm formula, whereupon it becomes proportional to the Clebsch-Gordan coefficient,

The radial integral is independent of the three magnetic quantum numbers (m′, q, m), and the trick we have just used does not help us to evaluate it. But it is only one integral, and after it has been done, all the other integrals can be evaluated just by computing or looking up Clebsch-Gordan
coefficients.

The selection rule m′ = q + m in the Clebsch-Gordan coefficient means that many of the integrals vanish, so we have exaggerated the total number of integrals that need to be done. But had we worked with the Cartesian components ri of r, this selection rule might not have been obvious. In any case, even with the selection rule, there may still be many nonzero integrals to be done (nine, in the case 3d → 2p).
The example we have just given of simplifying the calculation of matrix elements for a dipole transition is really an application of the Wigner-Eckart theorem, which we take up later in these notes.

Magnetic resonance

The spherical tensor formalism provides a common platform for treating coherence and relaxation in nuclear magnetic resonance. In NMR and EPR, spherical tensor operators are employed to express the quantum dynamics of particle spin, by means of an equation of motion for the density matrix entries, or to formulate dynamics in terms of an equation of motion in Liouville space. The Liouville space equation of motion governs the observable averages of spin variables. When relaxation is formulated using a spherical tensor basis in Liouville space, insight is gained because the relaxation matrix exhibits the cross-relaxation of spin observables directly.

Image processing and computer graphics

See also

 Wigner–Eckart theorem
 Structure tensor
 Clebsch–Gordan coefficients for SU(3)

References

Notes

Sources

Further reading

Spherical harmonics

Angular momentum and spin

Condensed matter physics

Magnetic resonance

Image processing

External links
(2012) Clebsch-Gordon (sic) coefficients and the tensor spherical harmonics
The tensor spherical harmonics
(2010) Irreducible Tensor Operators and the Wigner-Eckart Theorem 
Tensor operators
M. Fowler (2008), Tensor Operators
Tensor_Operators
(2009) Tensor Operators and the Wigner Eckart Theorem
The Wigner-Eckart theorem
(2004) Rotational Transformations and Spherical Tensor Operators
Tensor operators
Evaluation of the matrix elements for radiative transitions
D.K. Ghosh, (2013) Angular Momentum - III : Wigner- Eckart Theorem
B. Baragiola (2002) Tensor Operators
Spherical Tensors

Image processing
Quantum mechanics
Condensed matter physics
Linear algebra
Tensors
Spherical geometry